Scanlon is an Anglicized form of the Irish Gaelic name Ó Scannláin, meaning descendant of Scannlán’. Notable people with the name include:
 Agnes Scanlon (1923–2018), American politician
 Albert Scanlon (1935–2009), English soccer player
 Angela Scanlon (born 1983), Irish broadcaster
 Arthur Garrett Scanlon (aka Butch Scanlon) (1890–1945), American football coach
 Bill Scanlon (1956–2021), American tennis player
 Bridget Scanlon (born 1959), Irish-American hydrogeologist
 Craig Scanlon (born 1960), British musician
 Dan Scanlon (born 1976), American animator, writer and storyboard artist
 Denis Scanlon (born 1954), Australian rules footballer
 Dewey Scanlon (1899–1944), American football coach
 Eamon Scanlon (born 1954), Irish politician
 Edward Scanlon (1890–fl.1914), English footballer
 Eugene Scanlon (1924–1994), American politician
 Eugene Scanlon Jr., American judge
 Hugh Scanlon (1913–2004), Australian-born British trade unionist
 Ian Scanlon (born 1952), Scottish soccer player
 Jack Scanlon (born 1998), British actor
 Jack Scanlon (footballer) (1911–1972), Australian rules footballer
 James Scanlon (born 1948), Australian equestrian
 Joseph Scanlon (1924–1970), American politician
 Joseph A. Scanlon (1901–1957), American politician
 Larimar Fiallo Scanlón (born 1983), Dominican beauty contestant
 Leo Scanlon, American amateur astronomer for whom 8131 Scanlon is named
 Mark Scanlon (cyclist) (born 1980), Irish cyclist
 Mark Scanlon (surfer)
 Martin F. Scanlon (1889–1980), United States Air Force general
 Mary Scanlon (disambiguation), multiple people
 Michael Scanlon, American lobbyist
 Michael Scanlon (baseball) (1843–1929), Irish-born American baseball manager
 Michael Scanlon (poet) (1833–1917), Irish poet and statistician
 Pat Scanlon (outfielder) (1861–1913), American baseball player 
 Pat Scanlon (third baseman) (born 1952), American baseball player
 Pauline Scanlon, Irish singer
 Peter Scanlon (disambiguation), multiple people
 Phil Scanlon (born 1976), British musician
 Rich Scanlon (born 1980), American football player
 Séamus Scanlon (born 1981), Irish Gaelic footballer
 T. M. Scanlon (born 1940), American philosophy professor
 Terry Scanlon (1913–1996), Australian comedian and pantomime artist
 Thomas E. Scanlon (1896–1955), American politician
 Walter J. Scanlon, alias of Walter Van Brunt (1892–1971), American singer

See also
 Scanlan (disambiguation)
 Scanlon (disambiguation)

References